Ingjerd Thon Hagaseth (born 17 December 1967) is a Norwegian politician for the Liberal Party.

She served as a deputy representative to the Parliament of Norway from Oppland during the term 2013–2017. She has been deputy mayor of Etnedal, is educated in science from the University of Oslo and is a former school principal.

References

1967 births
Living people
People from Etnedal
University of Oslo alumni
Deputy members of the Storting
Liberal Party (Norway) politicians
Oppland politicians
Women members of the Storting
Heads of schools in Norway